The discography of Boogie Down Productions consists of five studio albums, one live album and two compilation albums.

Albums

Studio albums

Live albums

Compilation albums

Remix albums

Singles

As lead artist

References

Hip hop discographies
Discographies of American artists